Sharps Creek is a stream in McPherson County, Kansas and Rice County, Kansas, in the United States.

Sharps Creek was named for Isaac Sharp, a pioneer settler.

See also
List of rivers of Kansas

References

Rivers of McPherson County, Kansas
Rivers of Rice County, Kansas
Rivers of Kansas